KPNS (1350 AM) is a radio station licensed to Duncan, Oklahoma, United States. The station is currently owned by Mollman Media, Inc.

History
The station was assigned the call letters KRHD from 1947 thru 1998 and was named after its original owner R.H. Drewry. The station switched calls to KKEN on January 26, 1998. On January 28, 2000, the station changed its call sign to KXCD and on February 18, 2003 to the current KPNS.

References

External links

PNS